Israel Cook Russell, LL.D. (December 10, 1852 – May 1, 1906) was an American geologist and geographer who explored Alaska in the late 19th century.

Early life and education
Russell was born at Garrattsville, New York, on December 10, 1852. He received B.S. and C.E. degrees in 1872 from the University of the City of New York (now New York University), and later studied at the School of Mines, Columbia College.

Career
In 1874 he accompanied one of the parties sent out by the United States government to observe the transit of Venus, and was stationed at Queenstown, New Zealand. On his return in 1875 he was appointed assistant in geology at the School of mines, and in 1878 he became assistant geologist on the United States geological and geographical survey west of the 100th meridian.

In 1880, he became a member of the United States Geological Survey (USGS). Between 1881 and 1885 he worked at the Mono Lake in east-central California. Originally employed for work with regard to surveying and building the Bodie Railway connecting the Lake with Bodie, he stayed for four years and wrote the seminal work Quaternary History of Mono Valley, California (1884). He represented the USGS in 1889 in an expedition sent to Alaska by the U.S. Coast and Geodetic Survey to establish a portion of Alaska's eastern boundary. During the next two years, he explored, under the joint auspices of the USGS and the National Geographic Society, the slopes of Mount Saint Elias and the Yakutat Bay area. In 1890 he made the first reported sighting of Mount Logan, the highest mountain in Canada, and gave the mountain its name.

In 1892 he became professor of geology at the University of Michigan. At the time of his death, he was President of the Geological Society of America. 

In May 1902, Russell was one of a party of scientists who travelled on the USS Dixie to document the eruptions of La Soufriere, St Vincent and Mont Pelee, Martinique. Russell was sent by the National Geographic Society along with Robert T. Hill and Carsten Borchgrevink.

Death
Russell died suddenly on May 1, 1906, after suffering pneumonia.

Honours
In 1902, Marcus Baker of the USGS named Russell Fiord in his honor. Mount Russell in Alaska, Mount Rainier's Russell Glacier in Washington, Mount Russell (California), and the prehistoric Lake Russell in California's Mono Basin are also named for him.

Writing
Besides many contributions on geological subjects to various scientific periodicals, he published scientific memoirs, which were issued as annual reports of the Geological Survey, or as separate monographs.

Works
Sketch of the Geological History of Lake Lahontan (1883)
A Geological Reconnaissance in Southern Oregon (1884)
Existing Glaciers of the United States (1885)
Geological History of Lake Lahontan(1885)
Geological History of Mono Valley (1888)
Sub-Aerial Decay of Rocks (1888)
Lakes of North America (1895)
Glaciers of North America (1897)
Volcanoes of North America (1897)
Rivers of North America (1898)
North America (1904)

References

External links

 
 
 
 Geological Society of America Rock Stars article about Israel Cook Russell
 
 
  G.K. Gilbert "Israel Cook Russell" Journal of Geology 14,  Nov-Dec 1906, pp 663-667

American geologists
1852 births
1906 deaths
American science writers
19th-century American memoirists
United States Geological Survey personnel
National Geographic Society founders
University of Michigan faculty
Columbia School of Engineering and Applied Science alumni
New York University alumni
Presidents of the Geological Society of America